The Society of Saint Margaret (SSM) is an order of women in the Anglican Church. The Order is active in England, Haiti, Sri Lanka, and the United States and formerly Scotland.

History
The Sisters of St Margaret were founded in 1855 by Dr John Mason Neale at Rotherfield, England. As their numbers increased, they moved into their first convent, Saint Margaret's in East Grinstead, Sussex. The society began its overseas activities in 1873.

St Margaret's, East Grinstead

St Margaret's, East Grinstead, had a total of 201 inhabitants in 1881: 57 staff, six "Industrial Girl scholars", 69 "Orphanage scholars", and 60 "St Agnes School scholars". The 66 staff were made up of: 42 "Sisters of Mercy", four "Teachers in St Agnes School", 10 servants, and a chaplain, Laughton Alison; the remaining inhabitants were the gardener's family and a few visitors. The Convent thus already included both Sisters and teachers, and the people cared for included orphans, poor "industrial" girls and schoolgirls from wealthier families.

In 1891, St Margaret's, East Grinstead had 205 inhabitants. The pupils were now divided into: 20 girls in "Training for domestic service"; 57 "Pupils in Ladies School"; 61 "Scholars in Orphanage School" aged between 3 and 16. There were also seven orphans aged 15 or 16 "Training for service". There were 42 "Sisters of Charity", four teachers and a needlewoman "in Ladies' School", two "Caretakers in Orphanage", and two "Teachers in Day School" - the Ladies' School was for boarders.

Photographs show "St Margaret's Convent" at Moat Road until 1936, and the Orphanage at Moat Road until 1910 (when the photograph shows the orphans in white sleeveless smocks with hoods, worn over darker dresses).

19th-century opposition
The society had a difficult start.  Many Anglicans in the mid-19th century were  very suspicious of anything suggestive of Roman Catholicism. The founder, J. M. Neale, was attacked and manhandled at a funeral of one of the Sisters. However, Neale eventually won the confidence of many who had fiercely opposed the order.

Autonomous houses
The rapid growth of the Order led to the development of a series of autonomous convents and priories within the SSM, originally under the direction of the Founder. While all such autonomous houses practise the same SSM Rule of life, and recognise each other as a single Order, each house elects its own Mother Superior, and is independent in its work and decision-making. Since the death of Neale, there has been no single figure with authority across the entire Order. Several of these autonomous convents have dependent priories, which are smaller units of the Order, not having autonomous status, but whose sisters are under the authority of the Mother Superior of the 'parent' autonomous convent.

SSM (Duxbury, USA)
St Margaret's Convent, Duxbury, is an autonomous house of the Order, with its convent located at Duxbury, Massachusetts. This house has outreach ministries to schools, prisons, homeless shelters, and a number of local parish churches. The sisters were historically based in their convent in Boston, Massachusetts, whilst Duxbury was a dependent priory. However, following recent re-organisation, the convent at Boston has been vacated and made available for sale. Duxbury is now the chief convent of the community, although a small branch house is being retained in Boston, as well as in New York and Haiti.

There are dependent priories at:
 Boston, Massachusetts
 Port-au-Prince, Haiti
 New York

SSM (Hackney, England)

St Saviour's Priory, Haggerston, Hackney, is an autonomous house of the Order, located in the East End of London. In 1866 a small group of sisters went to Haggerston to establish a daughter house. It was led by Mother Kate from 1868 until shortly before her death in 1923. The sisters have a ministry amongst marginalised groups, the homeless, alcoholics, and racial minority groups. Some sisters are involved in parish work. It was operating in 2023.

SSM (Chiswick, England)

St Mary's Convent, Chiswick (in west London) was formerly a dependent daughter house of the large autonomous SSM house in Uckfield (St Margaret's Convent, Hooke Hall, Uckfield, East Sussex). The order was originally dedicated to nursing the sick, and at Chiswick the Uckfield sisters went on caring for elderly women in a nursing home, and maintained a guest house. In 2015 St Margaret's Convent was closed, and most of the sisters relocated to the Chiswick daughter house, which has now become their mother house. Mother Jennifer Anne was commissioned as Reverend Mother on 2 March 2015. At Chiswick the sisters still operate the nursing home. A small daughter house has been retained in Uckfield.

In 1896, the Anglican Order of St Mary and St John built what is now St Mary's Convent and Nursing Home on Burlington Lane, Old Chiswick. At its core is an Arts and Crafts Gothic building by the architect Charles Ford Whitcombe. Its chapel has a small square tower with a weather vane atop a slender conical spire; inside the chapel is a classical reredos, ceiling paintings by George Ostrehan, and a tapestry panel by Morris & Co. The convent and hospital is Grade II listed.

There is a dependent daughter house at:
 Uckfield, East Sussex

SSM (Colombo, Sri Lanka)
St Margaret's Convent, Polwatte, Colombo, is a semi-autonomous house of the Order. Technically still attached to the Uckfield sisters as a daughter priory, it is in the process of gaining independence. Sister Chandrani SSM is the local Sister Superior in Sri Lanka. 

In 1887, three sisters from St Margaret's Convent in East Grinstead came to Ceylon on missionary work. After a short stay at Green Path, they established their convent in Polwatte, Kollupitiya. For many years they ran Bishop's College, Colombo.

The Sisters run a retreat house, a children's home (mainly for those orphaned in the civil strife), a hostel for young women, a home for elderly people, and are involved in parish work and church embroidery.

There is a dependent priory (and children's home) at:
 Moratuwa, Sri Lanka

SSM (Walsingham, England)

In  1947 three Sisters from the house in Haggerston moved to Walsingham in Norfolk to help at the Anglican Shrine of Our Lady of Walsingham. The Priory of Our Lady, Walsingham, was founded in 1955 as a daughter priory, and gained independence as an autonomous house of the Order in 1994. The superior is Sister Mary Angela SSM. The sisters welcome guests and work in the Shrine of Our Lady of Walsingham; they are also involved in educational work.

Three sisters left the Church of England in 2010 to join the Personal Ordinariate of Our Lady of Walsingham within the Roman Catholic Church.

SSM (Aberdeen, Scotland)

The Order was at one stage very active in Scotland. The Episcopal Church in Gallowgate, Aberdeen, retains its dedication to Saint Margaret of Scotland and celebrates its history as a convent of the Order. In 2002 the last Reverend Mother (Mother Verity Margaret SSM) died, leaving just two sisters, and the autonomous house voluntarily closed. Both remaining sisters transferred into membership of SSM at Walsingham, although one of them (Sister Columba) still lives in Aberdeen.

References

External links
SSM (Chiswick)
SSM (Duxbury)
SSM (Hackney)
SSM (Walsingham)
S. Margaret's, East Grinsted, Sussex (1871) on Project Canterbury

Anglican orders and communities
Religious organizations established in 1855
Christian religious orders established in the 19th century
1855 establishments in England